Aqua Twist is a water-based teacup ride located at La Ronde, with other versions of the ride located at several Six Flags theme parks in North America. Designed by Mack Rides, a German ride manufacturer, the attraction is one of their "Twist 'n' Splash" models. Since 2013, Six Flags has installed Aqua Twists in three of their parks.

History
On August 30, 2012, La Ronde's owner Six Flags announced that they would be adding Aqua Twist to the park in 2013. On June 1, 2013, the attraction officially opened to the public, making La Ronde the first amusement park in North America to install a ride of its kind.

On June 28, 2013, Six Flags filed for a trademark with the United States Patents and Trademark Office for the name "Aqua Twist", leading to speculation that the company has plans for future installations at its other parks in the United States. On August 29, 2013, Six Flags officially announced the ride would be installed at Six Flags Discovery Kingdom and Six Flags St. Louis for the 2014 season under the name Tsunami Soaker. Tsunami Soaker at Six Flags St. Louis was the first to open in the United States on May 24, 2014, replacing the Powder Keg (also known as Hannibarrels) ride that had sat idle since 1997. A week later, Six Flags Discovery Kingdom open their new Tsunami Soaker on May 31, 2014, which is located at the former location of Wave Jumper located next to the wooden roller coaster, Roar.

In 2016, Six Flags renovated Roar at Six Flags Discovery Kingdom and reopened it as The Joker, which led to the re-theme of Tsunami Soaker to The Penguin Ride, themed after the DC Comics villain Penguin to fit the theme of the area of where the ride is located.

Installations

Ride experience
Riders board one of the nine boats. Before the ride's operational cycle begins the floor under the boats get filled with water, resulting in the boats floating. Once the ride begins the boats rotate like a traditional teacups attraction from an amusement park. There are six water guns that are equipped onto the boats as a way to splash other riders and bystanders. The ride operates with nine boats that feature six seats each, resulting in 54 riders per cycle.

References

External links
 Ride details on La Ronde's website
 Twist 'n' Splash

Amusement rides introduced in 2013
La Ronde (amusement park)
Six Flags attractions
Water rides
Water rides manufactured by Mack Rides